Waite is a single-member electoral district for the South Australian House of Assembly. Named after Peter Waite, a 19th century entrepreneur and philanthropist, it covers 75.4 km² of suburbs and foothills in Adelaide's inner south-east, taking in the suburbs of Belair, Blackwood, Brown Hill Creek, Coromandel East, Coromandel Valley, Crafers West, Craigburn Farm, Eden Hills, Glenalta, Hawthorndene, Kingswood, Lynton, Mitcham, Netherby, Springfield, Torrens Park, Urrbrae as well as part of Upper Sturt.

Waite was created in the 1991 electoral distribution as a comfortably safe Liberal seat, replacing the abolished district of Mitcham, the only single-member lower house seat anywhere throughout Australia to be won by the Democrats. At the 1993 election, Mitcham's last member, Liberal deputy leader Stephen Baker, easily retained it amid that year's decisive Liberal victory. Baker served as Treasurer from 1993 to 1997. Upon his retirement at the 1997 election, he was succeeded by Martin Hamilton-Smith, who represented the seat as a member of the Liberal Party for 17 years holding several ministries and shadow ministries, and for a period was Leader of the Opposition. Two months after the 2014 election, Hamilton-Smith became an independent and held several ministries in the Weatherill Labor government. He retired at the 2018 election and was succeeded by Sam Duluk, the former Liberal member for Davenport. Sam Duluk resigned from the Liberal Party to sit as an independent in 2020 after allegations of inappropriate behaviour. Duluk was defeated at the 2022 election by Catherine Hutchesson who won the seat for Labor for the first time in its history.

Members for Waite

Election results

Notes

References
 ECSA profile for Waite: 2018
 ABC profile for Waite: 2018
 Poll Bludger profile for Waite: 2018

1993 establishments in Australia
Electoral districts of South Australia